Aytos Point (Nos Aytos \'nos 'ay-tos\) is a point on the coast of Bransfield Strait, Livingston Island, Antarctica formed by an offshoot of Christoff Cliff.  The point was named after the Bulgarian town of Aytos.

Location

The point was mapped by the UK Directorate of Overseas Surveys in 1968, and by Bulgaria in 2005 and 2009.

See also
 Bulgarian toponyms in Antarctica
 Antarctic Place-names Commission

Maps
 South Shetland Islands. Scale 1:200000 topographic map. DOS 610 Sheet W 62 60. Tolworth, UK, 1968.
 Islas Livingston y Decepción.  Mapa topográfico a escala 1:100000.  Madrid: Servicio Geográfico del Ejército, 1991.
 S. Soccol, D. Gildea and J. Bath. Livingston Island, Antarctica. Scale 1:100000 satellite map. The Omega Foundation, USA, 2004.
 L.L. Ivanov et al., Antarctica: Livingston Island and Greenwich Island, South Shetland Islands (from English Strait to Morton Strait, with illustrations and ice-cover distribution), 1:100000 scale topographic map, Antarctic Place-names Commission of Bulgaria, Sofia, 2005
 L.L. Ivanov. Antarctica: Livingston Island and Greenwich, Robert, Snow and Smith Islands. Scale 1:120000 topographic map. Troyan: Manfred Wörner Foundation, 2010.  (First edition 2009. )
 Antarctic Digital Database (ADD). Scale 1:250000 topographic map of Antarctica. Scientific Committee on Antarctic Research (SCAR), 1993–2016.

External links
 Aytos Point. SCAR Composite Gazetteer of Antarctica.
 Bulgarian Antarctic Gazetteer. Antarctic Place-names Commission. (details in Bulgarian, basic data in English)
 Aytos Point. Copernix satellite image

Headlands of Livingston Island